Peter Gadiot (born 2 January 1986) is a British actor of Dutch and Mexican descent. He portrayed the role of James Valdez in the hit USA Network show Queen of the South. He also played Cyrus in ABC's Once Upon a Time in Wonderland and Adam in Showtime’s Yellowjackets. Additionally, Gadiot appears as Shanks in  Netflix's upcoming live action series One Piece and as Felix in a pilot for a new show, based on the Dutch series, Adam and Eva for NBC.

Early life
Raised primarily in the United Kingdom, his father is Dutch, and his mother is Mexican. He speaks both English and Spanish fluently. He has one older brother.

Career
Peter Gadiot trained classically at Drama Centre London and has appeared in numerous stage productions. His past credits include MTV's Hot Mess, the British series My Spy Family (2010) and a British horror film 13Hrs (2010), also known by the name Night Wolf.

In 2013, Gadiot made his American network debut as Cyrus, the handsome and mysterious Genie, in ABC's Once Upon a Time in Wonderland. That same year, Gadiot starred opposite Léa Seydoux in a short film (campaign) Prada: Candy for the fragrance Prada Candy L’Eau, directed by Wes Anderson and Roman Coppola. He also appeared in three episodes of the British series Fresh Meat, a Channel 4 dramedy with a large cult following. And starred in the German horror film The Forbidden Girl (2013).

Gadiot went behind the camera to write, direct and produce the short film 12–17, released in 2014. The short film is about young men who would deceive younger girls into falling in love with them before emotionally blackmailing them into becoming prostitutes (loverboys). The short film is called 12–17 because that’s the age of most girls who are trafficked.

Furthermore, Gadiot played in 2014 also the recurring role of Caesar in the series Matador and after that the role of Ka in the Canadian-American miniseries Tut (2015).

In 2016, Gadiot went back to the theater and played the lead role of Petruchio in William Shakespeare's The Taming of the Shrew at the Harman Center for the Arts in Washington DC.

From 2016 to 2021, Peter Gadiot starred as James Valdez in the crime drama series Queen of the South, produced for USA Network, an adaptation of Arturo Perez-Reverte's best-selling novel La Reina del Sur. Gadiot won the 2017 Imagen Award for Best Supporting Actor – Television for his presentation of James Valdez in USA Networks Queen of the South. In 2021, the fifth and final season of Queen of the South was broadcast on USA Network.

Beside his role in Queen of the South, Gadiot played Mister Mxyzptlk in CBS's Supergirl in the second season (2017). And Gadiot starred in the Rock ’n Roll miniseries All You Need Is Me (2018), which is released on Studio+ and Canalplus. Gadiot played the lead guitarist Stephen.

In the drama film Another Girl, released in 2021, Gadiot played Dave Hastings, the hot, married boss of Elle Overton. The film picks up where its predecessor, the cult hit Ask Me Anything, left off.

After the popular series Queen of the South, Peter Gadiot is featured in another series with extremely positive reviews, namely in Showtime's series called Yellowjackets (2021). Gadiot portrays Adam Martin, a magnetic and curious stranger who, drawn to something inexplicable in one of the adult Yellowjackets, will befriend and provoke her at a tumultuous time in her life. The series premiered in November 2021 on Showtime.

Peter Gadiot is filming for his role as Shanks in the upcoming Netflix's adventure fantasy live action television series One Piece, which is based on the ongoing Japanese manga series of the same name. Shanks is the captain of the Redhead Pirates, the man who inspired Luffy to become the King of the Pirates.

Recently Gadiot was cast as Felix, a recurring role in NBC's Pilot based on the Dutch series A'dam & Eva. Shooting has commenced in Montreal, Canada.

Filmography

Film

Television

Theater

Awards and nominations

Philanthropy
Peter Gadiot actively campaigns against slavery and human trafficking. To raise awareness of the problem of modern-day slavery, Peter Gadiot rowed Against Slavery across the Atlantic Ocean from the Caribbean to Africa with a crew in about 39 days. A huge achievement, which attracted enormous attention for the good cause.
Gadiot then ran The Marathon Des Sables (MDS - Marathon of the Sands), which is held for six consecutive days in the Saharan desert. The 250 km ultra marathon, includes running across ground with towering sand dunes, uneven rocky terrain and dangerous valleys, is considered the toughest foot race on Earth. 
He finally completed his journey by climbing Mount Kilimanjaro. In doing so, Gadiot completed a trilogy of extreme challenges within 1 year. In between Gadiot gave talks to thousands of school children educating them and creating awareness about the issues. With Rowing Against Slavery, Gadiot was able to raise money for Anti-Slavery International and Save the Children.

Today, Peter Gadiot regularly uses his social media exposure to raise awareness for humanitarian organizations such as Choose Love and Survival International.

References

External links
 
 

Living people
1985 births
21st-century British male actors
British actors of Latin American descent
English male film actors
English male television actors
English people of Dutch descent
English people of Mexican descent
Male actors from London
Male actors from Sussex
Male actors of Mexican descent